
Year 684 (DCLXXXIV) was a leap year starting on Friday (link will display the full calendar) of the Julian calendar. The denomination 684 for this year has been used since the early medieval period, when the Anno Domini calendar era became the prevalent method in Europe for naming years.

Events 
 By place 

 Europe 
 Ghislemar, mayor of the palace in Neustria and Burgundy, dies after a 2-year reign, and is succeeded by his father Waratton. He makes peace between the three Frankish kingdoms.

 Britain 
 King Ecgfrith of Northumbria sends a punitive expedition to Ireland under his ealdorman Berht, laying waste to the territory of Meath, ruled by High King Fínsnechta Fledach.

 Arabian Empire 
 Caliph Muawiya II dies at Damascus, after a brief reign that ends Sufyanid rule. A new caliph is proclaimed in Syria amidst tribal wars, but Marwan I will reign until next year.
 August 18 – Battle of Marj Rahit: Muslim partisans under Marwan I defeat the supporters of Abd Allah ibn al-Zubayr near Damascus, and cement Umayyad control of Syria.

 Asia 
 January 3 – Zhong Zong succeeds his father Gao Zong, and becomes emperor of the Tang Dynasty. His mother Wu Zetian remains the power behind the throne in China.
 February 27 – Wu Zetian replaces Zhong Zong in favor of his younger brother Rui Zong. He becomes a puppet ruler, and Zhong Zong is placed under house arrest. 
 Summer – The Pallava Empire (modern India) invades the kingdom of Ceylon. A Pallavan naval expedition employing Tamil mercenaries ends the Moriya Dynasty.
 September 7 – A large comet is observed in Japan (it's Japan's oldest observation record of Halley's Comet).
 November 13 – Emperor Tenmu institutes eight titles of eight classes (Yakusa-no-kabane) in Japan.
 November 26 – 684 Hakuho earthquake. A great earthquake strikes Japan. The people, houses, temples, shrines and domestic animals are greatly damaged.

 Mesoamerica 
 February 10 – K'inich Kan B'alam II accedes to the rulership of the Maya polity of Palenque (modern Mexico).

 By topic 

 Religion 
 Cuthbert is elected Bishop of Hexham, and receives a visit from a large group under Ecgfrith. He agrees to return to Lindisfarne (Northumbria) to take up duties. 
 June 26 – Pope Benedict II succeeds Leo II as the 81st pope of Rome, after a period of sede vacante ("vacant seat") of 1 year.

Births 
 Gao Lishi, official and eunuch of the Tang Dynasty (d. 762)
 Li Guo'er, princess of the Tang Dynasty (approximate date)
 Nagaya, Japanese prince and politician (d. 729)
 Tachibana no Moroe, Japanese prince and minister (d. 757)

Deaths 
 Adarnase II, king of Iberia (approximate date)
 Aldegonde, Frankish Benedictine abbess 
 Constantine of Mananali, founder of the Paulicians
 Ghislemar, mayor of the palace in Neustria and Burgundy
 Li Xian, prince of the Tang Dynasty (b. 653)
 Luo Binwang, Chinese poet and official 
 Muawiya II, Muslim caliph (b. 661)
 Pei Yan, chancellor of the Tang Dynasty
 Philibert of Jumièges, Frankish abbot
 Severus II bar Masqeh, Syriac Orthodox Patriarch of Antioch.

References 

 

da:680'erne#684